Stechlin-Ruppiner Land Nature Park is a nature park and reserve in the state of Brandenburg, Germany. It was established on July 1, 2001. It includes Lake Stechlin, home to the endemic Stechlin cisco.

Nature parks in Brandenburg
Protected areas established in 2001